The Poland women's national field hockey team represents Poland in international women's field hockey. In its only appearance in the Olympic Games, at the 1980 Moscow Games, the team lost all five of its matches, failing to score a single goal.

Tournament record

Summer Olympics
1980 – 6th place

EuroHockey Championship
2015 – 8th place

EuroHockey Championship II
2005 – 8th place
2009 – 7th place
2011 – 6th place
2013 – 
2017 – 5th place
2019 – 
2021 –

EuroHockey Championship III
2007 –

Hockey World League
2014–15 – 18th place
2016–17 – 19th place

FIH Hockey Series
2018–19 – Second round

See also
Poland men's national field hockey team

References

External links
Official website
FIH profile

European women's national field hockey teams
Field hockey
National team